Alain Etchegoyen (6 November 1951 in Lille – 9 April 2007 in Le Mans), was a philosopher and novelist.  He was the last Plan Commissionner before that Commission was abrogated. He wrote some twenty books, essays and novels.

A former student of l'École Normale Supérieure, he was a professor in classes prépas at the Lycée Louis-le-Grand, and in a professional lycée in Hauts-de-Seine.

Career
Etchegoyen started his career (1979–1982) in CNRS, then went to the Industry and Research Ministry (1982–1984), before working in the Plan Commission (1984–1985).

In 1985, Etchegoyen founded the Association de l'édition du Corpus des textes philosophiques de langue française. In the middle of the 1980s he created a consulting company, with Michelin among its customers. At the end of the 1980s he led the takeover of the faience maker Géo Martel. In the middle of the 90s he becomes administrator of Usinor-Sacilor (now part of Arcelor).

Politics
In his book Votre devoir est de vous taire (2005), written after the abrogation of the Plan Commission which he was leading, Etchegoyen had written a few pages about Ségolène Royal. He was writing among other things about his difficult relationship with the socialist presidential candidate, when she was an advisor to Minister of Education Claude Allègre.

He found his experience working with Ségolène Royal disappointing. He drew a portrait of Royal as a character "obsessed with image issues", and outlined how difficult it was to work with her, "I have always had trouble having an in depth discussion with Ségolène Royal, who only thought of scoring points."

Books
L'Entreprise a-t-elle une âme? (1990)
La Valse des éthiques (Prix Médicis essais 1991)
Eloge de la communication insupportable (1992)
La Démocratie malade du mensonge (1993), couronné du Grand prix de l'Académie française.
Vérités ou libertés, la justice expliquée aux adultes (2001)
Votre devoir est de vous taire (2005)
Meurtre à la virgule près (2007)

1951 births
2007 deaths
Writers from Lille
French National Centre for Scientific Research scientists
20th-century French philosophers
21st-century French philosophers
20th-century French novelists
21st-century French novelists
20th-century French essayists
École Normale Supérieure alumni
Deaths from cancer in France
French male essayists
French male novelists
21st-century French essayists
Prix Médicis essai winners
20th-century French male writers
21st-century French male writers